The 2009–10 season is the 18th year of football played by Aldershot Town and covers the period from 8 August 2009.

Match results

Friendlies

Football League Two

Play-offs

FA Cup

League Cup

Football League Trophy

Statistics

Appearances

Goalscorers

Transfers

Transfers in

Transfers out

Loans in

References

External links

Aldershot Town F.C. seasons
Aldershot Town